José Luis López Peinado (born 21 May 1943 in Tetuán, Spanish Morocco), known as just José Luis, is a Spanish former professional association football player who played as a defender. He started his career with one season at Rayo Vallecano, before representing Real Madrid from 1967 to 1976. Born in Spanish Morocco, he represented the Spain national team.

Career

International selection
He played 4 matches for the Spain national football team.

See also
List of Spain international footballers born outside Spain

External links
 
 
 madridista.hu
 futbol.sportec.es
 NFT Profile

1943 births
Living people
People from Tétouan
Spanish footballers
Spain international footballers
Moroccan footballers
Moroccan people of Spanish descent
Real Madrid CF players
Rayo Vallecano players
Inter FS players
La Liga players
Association football defenders
20th-century Moroccan people
Segunda División players